Givira fidelis is a moth in the family Cossidae. It is found in Costa Rica.

The wingspan is about 33 mm. The base, costal and inner margins, and median vein on the forewings are lilac brown, crossed by darker brown striae. There is a velvety black line along the inner margin from near the base to beyond the middle. The hindwings are fuscous grey, thinly scaled in the discal and postmedial area and with some indistinct darker striae.

References

External links
Natural History Museum Lepidoptera generic names catalog

Givira
Moths described in 1911